Guy's Cliffe (variously spelled with and without an apostrophe and a final "e") is a hamlet and former civil parish on the River Avon and the Coventry Road between Warwick and Leek Wootton, in the parish of Leek Wootton and Guy's Cliffe, in the Warwick district, in Warwickshire, England, near Old Milverton. In 1961 the parish had a population of 2.

Civil parish
It is in the civil parish of Leek Wootton and Guy's Cliffe; the latter was ecclesiastically on the same boundaries a minor chapelry. The secular version of the unit (i.e. civil parish) was, for a time, the least populous third-tier local authority in England; from 1 April 1986 it was merged with Leek Wootton to become "Leek Wootton and Guy's Cliffe" civil parish. Guy's Cliffe became a parish in 1858.

The name Guy's Cliffe originates from the name of the country house and estate that the land belonged to, which in turn was named after the cliff which the house itself was built on. The house has been in a ruined state since the late 20th century and is on the Heritage at Risk Register due to significant problems.

History

Before 1900

Guy's Cliffe has been around since Saxon times and derives its name from the legendary Guy of Warwick. Guy is supposed to have retired to a hermitage on this site, this legend led to the founding of a chantry. The chantry was established in 1423 as the Chapel of St Mary Magdelene and the rock-carved stables and storehouses still remain. After the Dissolution of the Monasteries by Henry VIII the site passed into private hands.

The current, ruined house dates from 1751 and was started by Samuel Greatheed, a West India slave-owner, merchant and Member of Parliament for Coventry 1747-1761. His son Bertie Greatheed inherited the estate after the death of his mother in 1774, he further improved the house and grounds in 1810, to heighten the picturesque qualities of the site.

The estate also comprised a mill, stables, kitchen garden and land as far as Blacklow Hill to the north-west of the house. It is the site of an ancient settlement and the location of Piers Gaveston, 1st Earl of Cornwall's murder. In 1821, Bertie Greatheed erected a stone cross to mark the execution, "Gaveston's Cross", and later commented in his diary that he could read the inscription on the cross with his telescope from the house.

1900 onwards

The house was used as a hospital during World War I and in World War II became a school for evacuated children.

Guy's Cliffe estate was broken up and sold in 1947. In 1952 the mill became a pub and restaurant and was named The Saxon Mill, the stables became a riding school, the kitchen garden became a nursery, all of which still exist today. A toll house also stood by the road to the north of the Saxon Mill, but this was demolished in the mid 20th century.

The new owner of the house intended to convert it into a hotel, but these plans came to nothing and the house fell into disrepair. In 1955, the house was purchased by Aldwyn Porter and the chapel leased to the Freemasons, establishing a connection with the Masons that remains today. The roof had fallen in by 1966. In 1982, during the filming of The Adventures of Sherlock Holmes (The Last Vampyre) a fire scene got out of control and seriously damaged the building, leading to an insurance claim. English Heritage has given the building grade II listed status.

One new house was built within the grounds, Guy's Cliffe House (note: the ruined house) and by the 1980s, when the parishes merged, the population of the Parish of Guy's Cliffe was no more than four people. The new boundary split the original estate: the stables and nursery are not within the current Parish of Leek Wootton & Guy's Cliffe, but the house, mill, and modern homes are.

Geology
The cliff is protected as Guy's Cliffe Site of Special Scientific Interest (SSSI) due to its geological interest.  Its citation states that this is due to it being a good exposure of Middle Triassic sandstone which is of particular interest for fossils of Mastodonsaurus.

Points of interest 

The chapel, used for Masonic ceremonies, has a large statue depicting Guy of Warwick.
Piers Gaveston, the favourite of Edward II, sought refuge and was (allegedly) apprehended here before his execution on nearby Blacklow Hill at Leek Wootton.
Saxon Mill on the River Avon, a former water-powered mill, now a pub and restaurant.

See also
Old Milverton

References
 Warwickshire Museum details for Guy's Cliffe House
 English Heritage: Heritage Gateway, architectural description of listed building
   A History of the County of Warwick Vol 8 (1969) pp434-447 British History Online

Specific

External links

 The GuysCliffeHouse.org.uk Photo Gallery Archive » A collection of historical and modern day photographs, images and depictions of Guys Cliffe House, Warwickshire, England...
 Guys Cliffe House entry from The DiCamillo Companion to British & Irish Country Houses
The Civil Parish of Leek Wootton and Guy's Cliffe Hubsite
Leek Wootton & Guy's Cliffe Parish Council

Villages in Warwickshire
Country houses in Warwickshire
Grade II listed buildings in Warwickshire
Structures on the Heritage at Risk register in Warwickshire
Former civil parishes in Warwickshire
Warwick District